UF Innovate | Accelerate @ Sid Martin Biotech is located in Alachua, Florida, in Progress District. The program's mission is to foster the growth of bioscience startup companies that have some relationship to the university. The Incubator works with companies in all product areas relating to the life sciences, biomedical research, medicine, and chemical sciences.

History
UF Innovate | Accelerate @ Sid Martin Biotech (formerly known as Sid Martin Biotechnology Development Institute) was officially founded on July 2, 1990, by the Florida Legislature.  It was named after Sid Martin, a member of the Florida House of Representatives, in recognition of his commitment to the state of Florida and the University of Florida. In 1994, the Trustees at the University of Florida authorized  to build the Sid Martin Biotech Incubator.

The facility was created, engineered, equipped, and opened in 1995 as one of the first bio-business incubators in the United States. Approximate cost at that time was $11.5 million. The facility is located just outside Gainesville, Florida in the Progress Corporate Park. Much of this research park was a product of the vision of former University of Florida President, Robert Q. Marston.

Graduate companies
Over 60 biotechnology startups have graduated from Sid Martin Biotech and become self-sufficient companies or were acquired. Among them are:
 Applied Genetic Technologies Corporation (AGTC)
 Bio Energy LLC
 Celunol (merged with Diversa as Verenium then acquired by BP Biofuels)
 EcoArray Inc.
 EnCor Biotechnology Inc.
 EraGen Biosciences (acquired by Luminex in 2011)
 Integrated Plant Genetics Inc.
 NanoMedex —   , the company was involved in reformulation of propofol into a nanoemulsion.  Development of the reformulation benefited from a SBIR grant and funding from "a large pharmaceutical company".
 Nanotherapeutics Inc.
 Oragenics Inc.
 Oxthera Inc.
 Sharklet Technologies Inc.
 SunPharm Inc. (acquired by GelTex which was acquired by Genzyme)
 Universal Air Technologies Inc. (acquired by Lennox Industries)
 Xhale Inc., which spun out Hygreen Inc.

Governance 
, the facility's Director was reported to be David L. Day.  , this role had been conferred upon Patti Breedlove.

Breedlove had previously been reported to be the Incubator's Manager (2007), and later its associate director (2011). She retired at the end of 2015, and Mark Long became director in 2016. Long retired in 2021 and Karl R. LaPan, MS, became Director; Elliott Welker, MBA, is the assistant director.

Resident companies
Sid Martin Biotech supports a wide range of bioscience companies including Erivan Bio, clean tech, diagnostic, therapeutic, drug delivery, genomic, bio-medical device, agbio, biofuels, and others.  The Incubator can host up to twenty resident companies at the facility.  Sid Martin Biotech companies have attracted more than $10.9 in equity investment, sales revenue, contracts, grants, and M&A activity.

International recognition
In 2007, the National Business Incubator Association(NBIA) recognized Sid Martin Biotech with a second-place ranking in the Technology category of its annual Incubator of the Year award program.  In 2013, the University Business Incubators group (UBI Global) ranked Sid Martin Biotech as "World's Best University Biotech Incubator" among 150 contenders across 22 countries.  The same year, 2013, Sid Martin Biotech won the NBIA's "Incubator of the Year" award. April 3, 2017 - Sid Martin Biotechnology Institute (SMBI), the leading biotechnology incubator at the University of Florida, has been awarded the Randall M. Whaley Incubator of the Year award for 2017, the highest award given by the International Business Innovation Association (InBIA). The Sid Martin Biotechnology Incubator program received a third Randall M. Whaley Incubator of the Year award in 2021.

References

External links

 Official website
 NBIA Awards
 BioFlorida BioDatabase
 Milken publications
 UF News about Milken

University of Florida
Business incubators of the United States
1995 establishments in Florida